Dedicated to Peter Kürten is the fourth album by Whitehouse released in 1981 by Come Organisation (later reissued by Susan Lawly). The album is also known by its full title, Dedicated to Peter Kürten Sadist and Mass Slayer.

Overview
The album cover features the image of the serial killer Peter Kürten, who has an instrumental track "dedicated" to him on the album. The album also marks the beginning of the themes concerning serial killers. The opening song features a sample of a news man reporting on the capture of Peter Sutcliffe for the "Yorkshire Ripper" killings.

The album includes new versions of the songs, "On Top", "The Second Coming" (both originally from their debut album Birthdeath Experience), and "Her Entry" (from the United Dairies compilation album Hoisting the Black Flag).

Dedicated to Peter Kürten was originally limited to 900 copies on vinyl, with the first edition consisting of 500 copies and the second edition consisting of 400 copies on the group-owned record label, Come Organisation. It was later reissued by the group's second record label, Susan Lawly, on compact disc in 1996.

Track listing
All tracks by William Bennett

"Ripper Territory" – 2:19
"Prosexist" – 2:03
"On Top (New Version)" – 2:04
"Pissfun" – 1:58
"Rapeday" – 2:03
"The Second Coming (New Version)" – 1:54
"Her Entry (New Version)" – 2:58
"CNA" – 2:51
"Dom" – 3:01
"Dedicated to Peter Kürten" – 3:02

Personnel 

William Bennett – vocals, synthesizer, production
Paul Reuter – synthesizer
Peter McKay – sound effects, production, engineering
George Peckham – mastering

References

External links
Dedicated to Peter Kürten at Susan Lawly
Whitehouse 1981-1982 recording dossier at Susan Lawly

Whitehouse (band) albums
1981 albums
Cultural depictions of Peter Kürten
Songs about crime
Songs about criminals